The George Albert Bradshaw House, at 265 N. 200 West in Beaver, Utah, was built in 1885.
It was listed on the National Register of Historic Places in 1983.

It was built by Yorkshire, England-born George Albert Irving Bradshaw.  It was deemed significant as a rare log house surviving in Beaver, and being in "excellent condition", and "having board-and-batten siding in the gables" and having more symmetry than most earlier cabins.

References

Houses on the National Register of Historic Places in Utah
Houses completed in 1885
Houses in Beaver County, Utah
National Register of Historic Places in Beaver County, Utah